The Abraham Aiken House is a historic house and estate located at Willsboro in Essex County, New York.

Description and history 
The home was built about 1807 and is in the Georgian style. It is a -story, rectangular, gable-roofed structure built of brick. It features a central Palladian window at the second level. Also on the property are a horse barn (c. 1807), tenants' cottage (c. 1840), and five stone lined wells.

It was listed on the National Register of Historic Places on June 8, 1989.

References

Houses completed in 1807
Houses on the National Register of Historic Places in New York (state)
Georgian architecture in New York (state)
Houses in Essex County, New York
National Register of Historic Places in Essex County, New York